Stemonosudis distans  is a species of fish found in the Western Central Pacific.

Size

References

Paralepididae
Taxa named by Vilhelm Ege
Fish described in 1957
Fish of the Pacific Ocean